This is a list of current and former Roman Catholic churches in the Roman Catholic Diocese of Fresno. The diocese consists of nine deaneries: Bakersfield Metropolitan; Fresno Metropolitan; Fresno Rural; High Desert; Kern Rural; Kings; Madera; Merced/Mariposa; and Tulare. The mother church of the diocese is St. John's Cathedral in Fresno, California.

Bakersfield Metropolitan Vicariate

Fresno Metropolitan Vicariate

Fresno Rural Vicariate

High Desert Vicariate

Kern Rural Vicariate

Kings Vicariate

Madera Vicariate

Merced/Mariposa Vicariate

Tulare Vicariate

References

 
Fresno